This article lists important figures and events in the public affairs of British Malaya during the year 1934, together with births and deaths of prominent Malayans.

Incumbent political figures

Central level 
 Governor of Federated of Malay States :
 Cecil Clementi (until 16 February)
 Shenton Whitelegge Thomas (from 9 November)
 Chief Secretaries to the Government of the FMS :
 Andrew Caldecott (until unknown date)
 Malcolm Bond Shelley (from unknown date)
 Governor of Straits Settlements : 
 Cecil Clementi (until 9 November) 
 Shenton Whitelegge Thomas (from 9 November)

State level 
  Perlis :
 Raja of Perlis : Syed Alwi Syed Saffi Jamalullail
  Johore :
 Sultan of Johor : Sultan Ibrahim Al-Masyhur
  Kedah :
 Sultan of Kedah : Abdul Hamid Halim Shah
  Kelantan :
 Sultan of Kelantan : Sultan Ismail Sultan Muhammad IV
  Trengganu :
 Sultan of Trengganu : Sulaiman Badrul Alam Shah
  Selangor :
 British Residents of Selangor : George Ernest London
 Sultan of Selangor : Sultan Sir Alaeddin Sulaiman Shah
  Penang :
 Monarchs : King George V 
 Residents-Councillors :  Arthur Mitchell Goodman
  Malacca :
 Monarchs : King George V 
 Residents-Councillors : M.W. Millington
  Negri Sembilan :
 British Residents of Negri Sembilan : John Whitehouse Ward Hughes
 Yang di-Pertuan Besar of Negri Sembilan : Tuanku Abdul Rahman ibni Almarhum Tuanku Muhammad 
   Pahang :
 British Residents of Pahang : Hugh Goodwin Russell Leonard
 Sultan of Pahang : Sultan Abu Bakar
  Perak :
 British Residents of Perak : G. E. Cater
 Sultan of Perak : Sultan Iskandar Shah

Events 
 12 February – Opening of Melaka General Hospital. 
 27 April – Straits Settlement Royal Naval Volunteer Reserve (SSRNVR) was established, predecessor to Royal Malaysian Navy.
 Unknown date – The Public Service Department was founded.

Births
22 January - Tunku Abdul Aziz, corporate figure and politician.

Deaths

See also
 1934
 1933 in Malaya
 1935 in Malaya
 History of Malaysia

References

1930s in British Malaya
Malaya